Kalloli  is a village in the southern state of Karnataka, India. It is located in the Gokak taluk of Belagavi district in Karnataka.here is a famous hanuman temple attracting devotees from karnatak,maharastra states

Demographics
 India census, Kalloli had a population of 16000 with 8300 males and 7700 females.

See also
 Belgaum
 Districts of Karnataka
 Shri Ramlingeshwar education society's
 Shri Basaveshwar education society's
 PJN high school

References

External links
 www.kallolitown.mrc.nic.in
 http://Belgaum.nic.in/

Villages in Belagavi district